Byfuglien is a surname. Notable people with the surname include:

 Dustin Byfuglien (born 1985), American professional ice hockey player 
 Helga Haugland Byfuglien (born 1950), Norwegian Lutheran bishop
 Kjetil Byfuglien (born 1977), Norwegian footballer